Maria Lúcia Ribeiro Alckmin (born 28 December 1951), commonly known as Lu Alckmin, is former first lady of the state of São Paulo, occupying the position of president of the São Paulo Social Fund between 2001 and 2006 and 2011 and 2018. In the 2022 elections, her husband was elected the 26th Vice President of Brazil, making her the second lady of the country effective 1 January 2023.

Lu Alckmin has been married to Geraldo Alckmin since 16 March 1979, when he was still in office as mayor of Pindamonhangaba. They have three children: Sophia, Geraldo and Thomaz (died 2015). She became First Lady of São Paulo in 2001 after her husband took over the state government following the death of then-Governor Mário Covas. Withith the re-election of Geraldo Alckmin in 2002, Lu continued as first lady of the state until 31 March 2006, when Alckmin resigned to run for president. 

In 2010, she returned to being first lady of the state due to her husband's election as governor. Geraldo was re-elected in 2014 for the same post. Lu remained the lady of the house at Palácio dos Bandeirantes until 2018, when her husband resigned again to run for president.

References

|-

|-

|-

Living people
1951 births
First ladies of São Paulo (state)
Spouses of Brazilian politicians
People from São Paulo